The governor of Telangana is the head of state of the Indian state of Telangana. The governors have similar powers and functions at the state level as those of the president of India at central level. They exist in the state appointed by the president of India for a term of five years and they are not local to the state that they are appointed to govern. The factors based on which the president evaluates the candidates is not mentioned in the constitution. The governor acts as the nominal head whereas the real power lies with the chief minister of the state and their council of ministers. The official residence of the governor is Raj Bhavan, situated in the state capital Hyderabad.

The current incumbent is Tamilisai Soundararajan since 8 September 2019.

Powers and functions

The governor enjoys many different types of powers:

Executive powers related to administration, appointments and removals,
Legislative powers related to lawmaking and the state legislature, that is Vidhan Sabha or Vidhan Parishad, and
Discretionary powers to be carried out according to the discretion of the governor.

List

Timeline

See also
 Telangana
 List of chief ministers of Telangana
 Governors of India

References

External links

Telangana
Governors of Telangana
G